Arthur Hermann Florstedt (18 February 1895 – on or after 5 April 1945), member of the NSDAP, was a German SS commander, war criminal and convicted war profiteer. He became the third commander of Majdanek concentration camp in October 1942. Florstedt was convicted of corruption and sentenced to death. Whether he was executed is unknown.

World War II
Florstedt joined the SS in 1933 achieving the rank of Standartenführer in 1938. He served at the Sachsenhausen concentration camp from 1940 till 1942. He was appointed the third chief of Majdanek extermination camp in October 1942 to replace SS-Sturmbannführer Max Koegel.

Florstedt was investigated by SS Judge Georg Konrad Morgen and charged by the Schutzstaffel (SS) with embezzlement and arbitrary killing of prisoner witnesses. Florstedt was one of two Majdanek commandants put on trial by the SS in the course of the camp operation. He was charged with corruption (wholesale stealing from the Third Reich); he had access to valuables stolen from Holocaust victims killed at death camps of Belzec, Sobibor and Treblinka. These valuables were stored and processed at Majdanek.

He was replaced by the interim commander Martin Gottfried Weiss. Florstedt was allegedly executed by the SS on 5 April 1945, the same day Karl-Otto Koch was executed. However, while Koch's execution has been confirmed, Florstedt's fate remains disputed.

Notes

1895 births
1945 deaths
German Army personnel of World War I
German prisoners sentenced to death
Majdanek concentration camp personnel
SS-Standartenführer
Prisoners sentenced to death by Germany
Sachsenhausen concentration camp personnel
Lorraine-German people
People from Bitche
Waffen-SS personnel
People convicted of corruption
People convicted of embezzlement
Missing person cases in Germany
1940s missing person cases